The Manitoba Fearless is the longest running Winnipeg-based women's tackle football team in the Western Women's Canadian Football League competing in the Prairie Conference. Founded in 2007, the Fearless are a charter member of the WWCFL, of which the league is currently in their 12th season. Their provincial rivals are the Winnipeg Wolfpack. The current head coach is Craig Bachynski and the team General manager is Lisa Cummings. Games are contested at Investors Group Field.

3 members of the Manitoba Fearless we part of the inaugural WWCFL board. As well both Fearless founder Tannis Wilson and current GM Lisa Cummings founded the Manitoba Girls Football Association.

The Fearless were catalyst to creating a league for Western Women to play in. They played the first cross border football games vs the Minnesota Vixen.

Year by year

IFAF competitors
The following recognizes women from the Manitoba Fearless that competed in the IFAF Women's World Football Championships

2010
Kathy Calancia, Defensive Line 
Patricia Eko-Davis, Defensive Back
 Jessica McCreary, Offensive Line
 Andrea Weichel, Defensive Line
Carol Whitman, Defensive Line

2013
Lisa Klaverkamp, Linebacker
Pauline Olynik, Defensive Back
Roxanna Cox, Receiver

2013
Alexa Matwyichuk, Defensive Line

References

Canadian football
Sport in Manitoba
Women's sports in Canada
Canadian football teams in Manitoba
2007 establishments in Manitoba
Women in Manitoba
Sports clubs established in 2007